The 4 × 800 metres relay is an athletics track event in which teams consist of four runners who each complete 800 metres or 2 laps on a standard 400 metre track.

The IAAF ratifies world records in the event and it became a world championship event in 2014 as part of the IAAF World Relays.

The men's world record is 7:02.43 by a Kenyan team of Joseph Mutua, William Yiampoy, Ismael Kombich and Wilfred Bungei, set August 25, 2006, at the Memorial Van Damme meet in Brussels, Belgium. The women's world record is 7:50.17, set by a team representing the Soviet Union, Nadiya Olizarenko, Lyubov Gurina, Lyudmila Borisova and Irina Podyalovskaya on August 15, 1984, in Moscow.

All-time top 15

Men
Correct as of September 2021.

Women
Correct as of September 2021.

References

External links
IAAF list of 4x800-metres-relay records in XML

 
Track relay races